Mayrín Villanueva Ulloa (born 8 October 1970) is a Mexican actress and model.

Villanueva has also posed for multiple magazines. She was considered for the role of Julia Montaño in the 2004 telenovela Apuesta por un Amor; the role was eventually given to Patricia Manterola. She starred as the protagonist in the 2013 telenovela Mentir para vivir.

Filmography

Awards and nominations

Notes
In late 2007 it was reported by several newspapers that Mayrín Villanueva had landed the role of "Bond girl" in the 2008 James Bond film Quantum of Solace. A press release later issued by a representative of the official casting agency for the film, Ricardo Hernández, stated that Mayrín had not been cast.

References

External links

Mayrín Villanueva at the Mexican Telenovela Database

1970 births
Living people
Mexican telenovela actresses
Mexican television actresses
Mexican female models
20th-century Mexican actresses
21st-century Mexican actresses
Actresses from the State of Mexico
People from Toluca